Air Inferno is a 1990 flight simulation arcade video game developed and released by Taito, in Japan, Europe and North America. A spin-off from Taito's Landing series, Air Inferno is an aerial firefighting simulation that involves piloting a helicopter on various rescue missions, shooting a fire extinguisher to extinguish flames while rescuing civilians.

Like its predecessor Top Landing (1988), Air Inferno used flat-shaded, 3D polygon graphics. Both games ran on the Taito Air System hardware, which used 68000 (12 MHz) and Z80 (4 MHz) microprocessors as CPU and a TMS320C25 (24 MHz) digital signal processor as GPU. The game comes in two types of arcade cabinets, a larger deluxe motion simulator cockpit cabinet and a smaller standard cockpit cabinet.

Reception 
In Japan, Game Machine listed Air Inferno on their August 1, 1990 issue as being the most-successful upright arcade/cockpit unit of the month.

The arcade game received positive reviews from critics. Sinclair User magazine it an 89% score, praising the "fab" 3D graphics, "realistic controls" and for being "something very different compared to the usual arcade machine." Julian Rignall rated the game 88% in Computer and Video Games magazine. Nick Kelly rated it 85% in CU Amiga. David Wilson rated it four out of five in Zero magazine, and 80% in Your Sinclair.

See also 
 Landing (series)
 Thunder Blade (1987)
 Steel Talons (1991)

References

External links
 Air Inferno at Arcade History
 

1990 video games
Arcade video games
Arcade-only video games
Helicopter video games
Flight simulation video games
Video games about firefighting
Taito arcade games
Aerial firefighting
Video games developed in Japan